La Hiruela is a municipality of the Community of Madrid, Spain. With a population of 75 inhabitants (INE 2022), in 2017 it was the third least populated municipality in the province.

Demography 
With an area of 17.18 km² and a population of 65 inhabitants, the population density in the municipality is 3.78 inhab/km² (2018). In 2020 it was the third least populated municipality in the Community of Madrid.

References 

Municipalities in the Community of Madrid